Já, truchlivý bůh (I, Mournful God) is a 1969 black-and-white Czech comedy film directed by Antonín Kachlík. Based on stories from Milan Kundera's book Laughable Loves, it stars Miloš Kopecký as Adolf, who relates a tale of spurned love to his friend Apostol (Pavel Landovský). Adolf has his friend to pose as an opera conductor to seduce the young woman (Hana Lelitová), as she loves opera, and then spurn her.

Cast
 Miloš Kopecký - Adolf
 Hana Lelitová - Janicka Malátová
 Pavel Landovský - Apostol Certikidis
 Jiřina Jirásková - Mrs. Stenclová
 Ivana Mixová - Cantatrice
 Kvetoslava Houdlová - Oculist
 Pavla Marsálková - Mrs. Malátová - mother
 Zdenek Kryzánek - Mr. Malát - father
 Jiří Přichystal - Singer
 Ilona Jirotková - Girlfriend
 Daniela Pokorná - Girlfriend
 Boleslava Svobodová - Ruzena
 Milivoj Uzelac - Conductor
 Helena Bendová - Housekeeper
 Vladimír Klemens - Music-master

External links
 

1969 films
1969 comedy films
Czechoslovak black-and-white films
Czech comedy films
1960s Czech-language films
1960s Czech films